Wilhelm Mannhardt (March 26, 1831, Friedrichstadt – December 25, 1880, Danzig) was a German mythologist and folklorist. He is known for his work on Germanic mythology, on Baltic mythology, and other pre-Christian European pantheons; and for his championing of the solar theory, namely in the early years of his career, under the influence of Jakob Grimm. Later on, Mannhardt focused more on vegetation spirits from an evolutionist point of view, namely the primitive tree cult and its later developments.

Works
De nominibus germanorum propriis quae ad regnum referuntur observationis specimen (1857)
Germanische Mythen: Forschungen (1858)
Die Götterwelt der deutschen und nordischen Völker (1860)
Roggenwolf und Roggenhund (1865)
Die Korndämonen (1868)
Letto-Preussische Götterlehre (1870)
Wald- und Feldkulte. Band 1: Der Baumkultus der Germanen und ihrer Nachbarstämme: mythologische Untersuchungen (1875 - reprint)
Wald- und Feldkulte. Band 2: Antike Wald- und Feldkulte aus nordeuropäischer Überlieferung erläutert (1877 - reprint)
Klytia (1875)
Gedichte. Mit einer Lebenskizze des Dichters. [Edited by L. and G. Mannhardt.] (1881)
Mythologische Forschungen (1884)

References

External links
 

People from Friedrichstadt
German folklorists
1831 births
1880 deaths
Balticists
Germanic studies scholars
Writers on Germanic paganism